Jared Wright is a newspaper editor, editorial cartoonist, and former Colorado politician. He has also worked as a police officer.
Wright served a single term in the Colorado House of Representatives from 2013 to 2015, representing House District 54 in Mesa and Delta counties.

After leaving office, he was appointed editor and publisher of the Denver-based political newspaper The Colorado Statesman, for which he had earlier been contributing political cartoons. 
Wright is from Fruita, Colorado and worked as a police officer there.

References

External links
 Political cartoons
 Wright's page at The Colorado Statesman.

21st-century American politicians
Living people
Republican Party members of the Colorado House of Representatives
People from Mesa County, Colorado
American editorial cartoonists
American newspaper editors
Year of birth missing (living people)